Hermans is a Dutch patronymic surname, cognate with German Hermann and  and the Scandinavian Hermansen. It is the 14th most common name in Belgium, with 12,794 people named Hermans in 2008. In the Netherlands, 10,641 people carried the name in 2007.

People 
 Alex Hermans, Belgian Paralympian shot putter
 Ben Hermans (b. 1986), Belgian bicyclist
 Baldur Hermans, (1936–2015) German historian & scout
 Charles Hermans (1839–1924), Belgian painter
 Edwin Hermans (b. 1974), Dutch footballer
 Elisabeth Hermans, Belgian soprano
 Femke Hermans, Belgian boxer
 Hubert Hermans (b. 1937), Dutch psychologist
 Johan Hermans (born 1956), British botanist whose botanical abbreviation is Hermans
 Joseph Hermans (fl. 1920), Belgian archer
 Loek Hermans (b. 1951), Dutch politician
 Margriet Hermans (b. 1954), Belgian politician
 Mathieu Hermans (b. 1963), Dutch bicyclist
 Pierre Hermans (b. 1953), Dutch field hockey player
 Toon Hermans (1916–2000), Dutch comedian, singer and writer
 Ward Hermans (1897–1992), Belgian Flemish nationalist politician and writer
 Willem Frederik Hermans (1921–1995), Dutch author

See also 
 Herman (name)
 Hermann (name)
 Hermansen
 Arman (name)
 Armand (name)

References 

Dutch-language surnames
Patronymic surnames